The 1936 All-Pro Team consisted of American football players chosen by various selectors for the All-Pro team of the National Football League (NFL) for the 1936 NFL season. Teams were selected by, among others, the NFL coaches (NFL), the United Press (UP), Collyer's Eye (CE), and the Chicago Daily News (CDN).

Four players were selected for the first team by all four selectors: Detroit Lions quarterback Dutch Clark; Boston Redskins halfback Cliff Battles; Chicago Bears end Bill Hewitt; and Green Bay Packers guard Lon Evans. Three others were selected for the first team by three selectors: Chicago Bears fullback Bronko Nagurski; Boston Redskins tackle Turk Edwards; and New York Giants center Mel Hein.

Team

References

All-Pro Teams
1936 National Football League season